The Chairman of the Board is a 1959 studio album by Count Basie and his orchestra.

Track listing 
 "Blues in Hoss' Flat" (Count Basie, Frank Foster) – 3:13
 "H.R.H. (Her Royal Highness)" (Count Basie, Thad Jones) – 2:40
 "Segue in C" (Frank Wess) – 6:15
 "Kansas City Shout" (Henry Wells) – 3:34
 "Speaking of Sounds" (Thad Jones) – 3:27
 "TV Time" (Frank Foster) – 3:16
 "Who, Me?" (Frank Foster) – 5:13
 "The Deacon" (Thad Jones) – 4:50
 "Half Moon Street" (Frank Wess) – 3:25
 "Mutt & Jeff" (Thad Jones, Jack McDuff) – 3:39
 "Fair and Warmer" (Harry James, Ernie Wilkins) – 3:35 Bonus track on CD reissue
 "Moten Swing" (Bennie Moten, Buster Moten) – 4:51 Bonus track on CD reissue
Recorded at Universal Studios, Chicago on March 4, 1958 (Track 1 & 2) and Capital Studios, New York on April 28 (Track 7, 9, 12), April 29 (Track 4, 10, 11), December 10 (Track 5 & 8) and December 11 (Track 3 & 6), 1958.

Personnel 
The Count Basie Orchestra
 Count Basie - piano
 Frank Foster - arranger, tenor saxophone
 Ernie Wilkins - arranger
 Eddie Jones - double bass
 Charlie Fowlkes - bass clarinet, baritone saxophone
 Marshal Royal - clarinet, alto saxophone
 Sonny Payne - drums
 Frank Wess - flute, arranger, alto saxophone
 Freddie Green - guitar
 Billy Mitchell - tenor saxophone
 Henry Coker - trombone
 Al Grey - trombone
 Benny Powell - trombone
 Thad Jones - trumpet, arranger
 Wendell Culley - trumpet
 Joe Newman - trumpet
 Snooky Young - trumpet

References 

1959 albums
Count Basie Orchestra albums
Roulette Records albums
Albums arranged by Ernie Wilkins
Albums arranged by Frank Foster (musician)
Albums arranged by Thad Jones
Albums arranged by Frank Wess
Albums produced by Teddy Reig